Anders Broström (born 18 September 1952 in Ronneby, Sweden) is a retired Swedish ice hockey player.

Broström began with career with Tingsryds AIF in 1970.  He joined Frölunda HC in 1976 and remained with the team until 1984.  He had a spell in Norway with Sparta Warriors before finishing his career in the Swedish lower league. The Boston Bruins of the National Hockey League signed him to a contract in 1981 though he never played in North America. He made seven appearances for in the Swedish national men's ice hockey team.

References

External links

1952 births
Frölunda HC players
Living people
Sparta Warriors players
Swedish ice hockey defencemen
Tingsryds AIF players